The Children Act is a 2017 drama film directed by Richard Eyre, produced by Duncan Kenworthy, and written by Ian McEwan, based on his 2014 novel of the same name. It stars Emma Thompson, Stanley Tucci, and Fionn Whitehead.

The film had its world premiere at the 42nd Toronto International Film Festival on 9 September 2017. and was released in the United Kingdom on 24 August 2018, by Entertainment One, and through DirecTV Cinema on 16 August 2018, before opening in the US in a limited release on 14 September 2018, by A24.

Plot

Fiona Maye is a judge in the Family Division of the High Court of Justice of England and Wales. A case is brought before her involving a 17-year-old boy, Adam Henry, who is suffering from leukaemia. Adam's doctors want to perform a blood transfusion, as that will allow them to use more drugs to cure him. However, Adam and his parents are Jehovah's Witnesses, and believe that having a blood transfusion is against biblical principles. Fiona goes to the hospital to see Adam. The two talk, with Fiona attempting to determine what it is that Adam really wants, and whether he has been persuaded by his parents. When she asks Adam whether he is aware refusing the blood transfusion could, rather than kill him, render him disabled, Adam answers yes, and he'd hate it but accept the cost. She asks Adam to play a song for her. Adam starts to play "Down by the Salley Gardens", which Fiona then sings. Adam is very drawn to Fiona, and begs her not to leave. Fiona nevertheless leaves, and returns to court. She rules that, as a matter of law, Adam's welfare is the "paramount consideration" and declares that  the medical treatment, including blood transfusion, may proceed despite the absence of Adam's consent and that of his parents.

Meanwhile, Fiona's marriage is failing. Her husband, Jack, has said that he wants to have an affair with a colleague. He has become tired of Fiona constantly working and never having time for him. He says that he will have an affair, but is being totally open about it. He claims that he has never stopped, and will never stop, loving her. He packs his bags and drives off. She carries on with work without making contact, changes the locks, and begins rehearsing the piano with Mark Berner (Anthony Calf),  a colleague. Jack returns after two days. After letting him in, Fiona acts very coldly towards him, resulting in an argument between the two, after Fiona is seen to have been to the office of a divorce solicitor.

The transfusion is successful, and Adam is released from the hospital. He leaves many messages for Fiona, saying that she has changed the way that he thinks about the world. He follows her to work one day, and gives her various poems and letters that he has written. She tells him to stop following her; she has other cases, while he is still young and has his whole life in front of him. Next, Fiona travels to Newcastle for an Oath of Allegiance ceremony, and Adam follows her there. He tells her that he wants to live with her, as he does not understand why his parents were happy for him to die. Fiona sends him back to London. He kisses her on the lips and in the moment she accepts.

Shortly after she returns to London, Fiona accompanies Mark Berner on the piano at a lawyers' concert. Just before she is due to play, she gets a note saying that Adam has relapsed and may not make it through the night. Instead of the planned encore, she plays and sings "Down by the Salley Gardens", before rushing to the hospice to see Adam. Adam has refused another blood transfusion, saying that it is his choice. Fiona returns home, and breaks down in front of Jack, telling him the story and calling Adam a "lovely boy". She falls asleep holding Jack's hand.

Adam dies and Fiona attends his funeral, before walking away with Jack.

Cast

Production
On 29 August 2016, it was reported that Emma Thompson was in talks to star in an adaptation of the Ian McEwan novel The Children Act directed by Richard Eyre and produced by Duncan Kenworthy. On 3 October 2016, Stanley Tucci and Fionn Whitehead joined the cast. Production was set to begin in London in October 2016, and it was reported on 8 December 2016, that filming had wrapped.

Release
The film had its world premiere at the Toronto International Film Festival on 9 September 2017. Shortly after that, A24 and DirecTV Cinema acquired distribution rights to the film.

The film was released in the United Kingdom on 24 August 2018 by Entertainment One. It is scheduled to be released in the United States through DirecTV Cinema on 16 August 2018, before being released in a limited release on 14 September 2018.

Reception
The Children Act received positive reviews from film critics. It holds an approval rating of 74% on review aggregator website Rotten Tomatoes, based on 112 reviews, with a weighted average of 6.7/10. The website's critical consensus reads, "The Children Act showcases yet another powerful performance from Emma Thompson, who elevates this undeniably flawed picture into an affecting adult drama." On Metacritic, the film holds a rating of 62 out of 100, based on 28 critics, indicating "generally favorable reviews".

Peter Debruge of Variety gave the film a positive review, writing, "The Children Act is that rarest of things: an adult drama, written and interpreted with a sensitivity to mature human concerns." Stephen Farber of The Hollywood Reporter also gave the film a positive review, saying, "The two central performances could hardly be better. Thompson works here with remarkable subtlety."

References

External links

2017 films
2017 drama films
2010s English-language films
A24 (company) films
American drama films
BBC Film films
British drama films
FilmNation Entertainment films
Adultery in films
Films about cancer
Films about religion
Films based on British novels
Films directed by Richard Eyre
Films scored by Stephen Warbeck
Films shot in London
Films with screenplays by Ian McEwan
Jehovah's Witnesses
2010s American films
2010s British films